Slavec is a village and municipality in the Rožňava District in the Košice Region of middle-eastern Slovakia.

History
In historical records the village was first mentioned in 1320.

Geography
The village lies at an altitude of 232 metres and covers an area of 17.527 km².
It has a population of about 475 people.

Culture
The village has a public library.

External links
 Slavec
http://www.statistics.sk/mosmis/eng/run.html

Villages and municipalities in Rožňava District